Darreh-ye Alucheh (also Romanized as Darreh-ye Ālūcheh; also known as Darreh Ālīcheh) is a village in Chenarud-e Jonubi Rural District, Chenarud District, Chadegan County, Isfahan Province, Iran. At the 2006 census, its population was 37, in 7 families.

References 

Populated places in Chadegan County